Hexachlorocyclohexa-2,5-dien-1-one, sometimes informally called hexachlorophenol (HCP) is an organochlorine compound. It can be prepared from phenol. Despite the informal name, the compound is not a phenol but is a ketone. The informal name is derived from its method of preparation which includes phenol as a reagent.

Preparation
HCP is normally produced by chlorination of phenol by chlorine in the presence of metal chloride catalyst, such as ferric chloride. It can also be produced by alkaline hydrolysis of polychlorinatedbenzenes at high temperature and pressure, by conversion of diazonium salts of chlorinated anilines, or by chlorination of phenolsulfonic acids and benzenesulfonic acids followed by removal of the sulfonic acid group.  The hydrolysis of HCP gives chloranil.

References

See also
 Pentachlorophenol
 Hexachlorobenzene

Disinfectants
Fungicides
Organochlorides
Ketones